Allen Township is one of the seventeen townships of Hancock County, Ohio, United States. As of the 2010 census, the population was 2,533, up from 2,110 in the 2000 census.

Geography
Located in the northern part of the county, it borders the following townships:
Bloom Township, Wood County - northeast
Cass Township - east
Marion Township - southeast
Liberty Township - southwest
Portage Township - west
Henry Township, Wood County - northwest

Several populated places are located in Allen Township:
Part of Findlay, a city and the county seat of Hancock County, in the south
Van Buren, a village in the north
Mortimer, an unincorporated community in the center

Name and history
Statewide, other Allen Townships are located in Darke, Ottawa, and Union counties.

Government
The township is governed by a three-member board of trustees, who are elected in November of odd-numbered years to a four-year term beginning on the following January 1. Two are elected in the year after the presidential election and one is elected in the year before it. There is also an elected township fiscal officer, who serves a four-year term beginning on April 1 of the year after the election, which is held in November of the year before the presidential election. Vacancies in the fiscal officership or on the board of trustees are filled by the remaining trustees.

References

External links
Allen Township official website

Townships in Hancock County, Ohio
Townships in Ohio